Khalid Khan a Pakistani politician hailing from Charsadda District, belonging to Pakistan Tehreek-e-Insaf, he did LLB from peshawar University. Khan served as a member of the Provincial Assembly of Khyber Pakhtunkhwa from May 2013 to May 2018 and from August 2018 to January 2023. He also served as a member of different committees.

Political career
Khan was elected as the member of the Khyber Pakhtunkhwa Assembly on ticket of Qaumi Watan Party from PK-20 (Charsadda-IV) in 2013 Pakistani general election.

On 21 May 2018, he quits QWP and joined Pakistan Tehreek-e-Insaf and was re-elected to the KPK assembly on the ticket of Pakistan Tehreek-e-Insaf in the 2018 General Elections.

References

Living people
Pashtun people
Khyber Pakhtunkhwa MPAs 2013–2018
Qaumi Watan Party politicians
People from Charsadda District, Pakistan
Pakistan Tehreek-e-Insaf MPAs (Khyber Pakhtunkhwa)
Year of birth missing (living people)